The Salinas Peppers were an independent baseball team located in Salinas, California.  The team played in the independent Western Baseball League, and was not affiliated with any Major League Baseball team.  Their home stadium was Salinas Municipal Stadium.

The Peppers were founded in 1995 and played for three seasons.

External links
Baseball Reference

Western Baseball League teams
Sports in Monterey County, California
Sports in Salinas, California
Defunct baseball teams in California
Baseball teams established in 1995
1995 establishments in California
1997 disestablishments in California
Baseball teams disestablished in 1997
Defunct independent baseball league teams
Professional baseball teams in California